Nguyễn Ngọc Lễ (1918-1972) was an officer in the Army of the Republic of Vietnam. He was also the head of the National Police in the 1950s. Lễ strongly advocated the assassination of President Ngô Đình Diệm and his younger brother and advisor Ngô Đình Nhu after they were arrested at the end of an army coup. Although his army colleagues did not agree with his proposal, the brothers were shot anyway, believed to have been on the orders of General Dương Văn Minh against consensus.

References

See also 
Arrest and assassination of Ngo Dinh Diem
1963 South Vietnamese coup

Army of the Republic of Vietnam generals
1918 births
1972 deaths
Vietnamese people of the Vietnam War
South Vietnamese military personnel of the Vietnam War